James Hardy (January 15, 1923 – September 20, 1986) was an American competition rower, born in San Francisco, and Olympic champion, and later traffic engineer. He won a gold medal in coxed eights at the 1948 Summer Olympics, as a member of the American team.

References

1923 births
1986 deaths
Rowers from San Francisco
Rowers at the 1948 Summer Olympics
Olympic gold medalists for the United States in rowing
American male rowers
Medalists at the 1948 Summer Olympics